Walter Salzmann (May 13, 1936 - September 12, 2012) was a Swiss professional ice hockey forward who played for EHC Visp in the National League A. He also represented the Swiss national team at the 1964 Winter Olympics.

References

External links
Walter Salzmann's stats at Sports-Reference.com

1936 births
2012 deaths
Ice hockey players at the 1964 Winter Olympics
Olympic ice hockey players of Switzerland
Swiss ice hockey forwards